In mathematics, a totally disconnected group is a topological group that is totally disconnected. Such topological groups are necessarily Hausdorff.

Interest centres on locally compact totally disconnected groups (variously referred to as groups of td-type, locally profinite groups, or t.d. groups). The compact case has been heavily studied – these are the profinite groups – but for a long time not much was known about the general case. A theorem of van Dantzig from the 1930s, stating that every such group contains a compact open subgroup, was all that was known. Then groundbreaking work by George Willis  in 1994, opened up the field by showing that every locally compact totally disconnected group contains a so-called tidy subgroup and a special function on its automorphisms, the scale function, giving a quantifiable parameter for the local structure. Advances on the global structure of totally disconnected groups were obtained in 2011 by Caprace and Monod, with notably a classification of characteristically simple groups and of Noetherian groups.

Locally compact case

In a locally compact, totally disconnected group, every neighbourhood of the identity contains a compact open subgroup. Conversely, if a group is such that the identity has a neighbourhood basis consisting of compact open subgroups, then it is locally compact and totally disconnected.

Tidy subgroups
Let G be a locally compact, totally disconnected group, U a compact open subgroup of G and  a continuous automorphism of G.

Define:
   

The scale function
Define the scale function  as this index. Restriction to inner automorphisms gives a function on G with interesting properties. These are in particular:
Define the function  on G by 
, 

Properties
  is continuous.
 , whenever x in G is a compact element.
  for every non-negative integer .

Calculations and applications
The scale function was used to prove a conjecture by Hofmann and Mukherja and has been explicitly calculated for p-adic Lie groups and linear groups over local skew fields by Helge Glöckner.

Notes

References

G.A. Willis - The structure of totally disconnected, locally compact groups, Mathematische Annalen 300, 341-363 (1994)

Topological groups